John Edward Warnock (born October 6, 1940) is an American computer scientist and businessman best known for co-founding Adobe Systems Inc., the graphics and publishing software company, with Charles Geschke. Warnock was President of Adobe for his first two years and chairman and CEO for his remaining sixteen years at the company. Although he retired as CEO in 2000, he still co-chaired the board with Geschke. Warnock has pioneered the development of graphics, publishing, Web and electronic document technologies that have revolutionized the field of publishing and visual communications.

Early life and education 
Warnock was born and raised in Salt Lake City, Utah. Although he failed mathematics in ninth grade while graduating from Olympus High School in 1958,   Warnock went on to earn a Bachelor of Science degree in mathematics and philosophy, a Doctor of Philosophy degree in electrical engineering (computer science), and an honorary degree in science, all from the University of Utah. At the University of Utah he was a member of the Gamma Beta Chapter of the Beta Theta Pi fraternity. He also has an honorary degree from the American Film Institute. He currently lives in the San Francisco Bay Area with his wife Marva E. Warnock, an illustrator. They have three children.

Career 
Warnock's earliest publication and subject of his master's thesis, was his 1964 proof of a theorem solving the Jacobson radical for row-finite matrices, which was originally posed by the American mathematician Nathan Jacobson in 1956.

In his 1969 doctoral thesis, Warnock invented the Warnock algorithm for hidden surface determination in computer graphics.
It works by recursive subdivision of a scene until areas are obtained that are trivial to compute. It solves the problem of rendering a complicated image by avoiding the problem. If the scene is simple enough to compute then it is rendered; otherwise it is divided into smaller parts and the process is repeated. Warnock notes that for this work he received "the dubious distinction of having written the shortest doctoral thesis in University of Utah history".

In 1976, while Warnock worked at Evans & Sutherland, a Salt Lake City-based computer graphics company, the concepts of the PostScript language were seeded. Prior to co-founding Adobe, with Geschke and Putman, Warnock worked with Geschke at Xerox's Palo Alto Research Center (Xerox PARC), where he had started in 1978. Unable to convince Xerox management of the approach to commercialize the InterPress graphics language for controlling printing, he, together with Geschke and Putman, left Xerox to start Adobe in 1982. At their new company, they developed an equivalent technology, PostScript, from scratch, and brought it to market for Apple's LaserWriter in 1985.

In the spring of 1991, Warnock outlined a system called "Camelot", that evolved into the Portable Document Format (PDF) file-format. The goal of Camelot was to "effectively capture documents from any application, send electronic versions of these documents anywhere, and view and print these documents on any machines". Warnock's document contemplated: 

One of Adobe's popular typefaces, Warnock, is named after him.

Adobe's PostScript technology made it easier to print text and images from a computer, revolutionizing media and publishing in the 1980s.

In 2003, Warnock and his wife donated 200,000 shares of Adobe Systems (valued at over $5.7 million) to the University of Utah as the main gift for a new engineering building. The John E. and Marva M. Warnock Engineering Building was completed in 2007 and houses the Scientific Computing and Imaging Institute and the Dean of the University of Utah College of Engineering.

Dr. Warnock holds seven patents. In addition to Adobe Systems, he serves or has served on the board of directors at ebrary, Knight-Ridder, MongoNet, Netscape Communications and Salon Media Group. Warnock is a past Chairman of the Tech Museum of Innovation in San Jose. He also serves on the board of trustees of the American Film Institute and the Sundance Institute.

His hobbies include photography, skiing, Web development, painting, hiking, curation of rare scientific books and historical Native American objects.

A strong supporter of higher education, Warnock and his wife, Marva, have supported three presidential endowed chairs in computer science, mathematics and fine arts at the University of Utah and also an endowed chair in medical research at Stanford University.

Recognition
The recipient of numerous scientific and technical awards, Warnock won the Software Systems Award from the Association for Computing Machinery in 1989.
In 1995 Warnock received the University of Utah Distinguished Alumnus Award and in 1999 he was inducted as a Fellow of the Association for Computing Machinery.
Warnock was awarded the Edwin H. Land Medal from the Optical Society of America in 2000.
In 2002, he was made a Fellow of the Computer History Museum for "his accomplishments in the commercialization of desktop publishing with Chuck Geschke and for innovations in scalable type, computer graphics and printing."
Oxford University's Bodleian Library bestowed the Bodley Medal on Warnock in November 2003.

In 2004, Warnock received the Lovelace Medal from the British Computer Society in London.
In October 2006, Warnock—along with Adobe co-founder Charles Geschke—received the American Electronics Association's Annual Medal of Achievement Award, being the first software executives to receive this award.
In 2008, Warnock and Geschke received the Computer Entrepreneur Award from the IEEE Computer Society "for inventing PostScript and PDF and helping to launch the desktop publishing revolution and change the way people engage with information and entertainment".
In September 2009, Warnock and Geschke were chosen to receive the National Medal of Technology and Innovation, one of the nation's highest honors bestowed on scientists, engineers and inventors.
In 2010, Warnock and Geschke received the Marconi Prize, considered the highest honor specifically for contributions to information science and communications.

Warnock is a member of the National Academy of Engineering, the American Academy of Arts and Sciences, and the American Philosophical Society, the latter being America's oldest learned society.

He has received honorary degrees from the University of Utah, the American Film Institute, and The University of Nottingham in the UK.

See also
 Warnock algorithm

References

External links
 Interview in Knowledge@Wharton published January 20, 2010
 Biography at Computer History Museum
 Biography on Adobe Web site
 Warnock's Utah Bed and Breakfast-The Blue Boar Inn
 Warnock's Rare Book Room educational site which allows visitors to examine and read some of the great books of the world
 Warnock's Splendid Heritage website which documents rare American Indian objects from private collections
 

1940 births
Adobe Inc. people
American computer programmers
Computer graphics professionals
Computer graphics researchers
Fellows of the Association for Computing Machinery
Living people
University of Utah alumni
National Medal of Technology recipients
Businesspeople from Salt Lake City
Members of the United States National Academy of Engineering
American technology company founders
Scientists at PARC (company)